Eggenberg may refer to:

Places
 Eggenberg (Graz), Austria
 Eggenberg Palace, Graz
 Eggenberg, Mühleberg, Berne, Switzerland
 Eggenberg House, in Sopron, Hungary

Other uses
 Eggenberg family, an Austrian noble family first mentioned in 1432, including a list of people with the name
 Pivovar Eggenberg, a brewery in the Czech Republic
 Eggenberg Castle, Vorchdorf, a brewery in Austria

See also

Eggenberger (disambiguation)